John Forde (1920 – 18 April 2010) was an Irish sportsperson. He played Gaelic football with his local clubs Ardnaree and Ballina Stephenites and was a member of the senior Mayo county team from 1949 until 1955.

References

1920 births
2010 deaths
Ardnaree Gaelic footballers
Ballina Stephenites Gaelic footballers
Gaelic football backs
Mayo inter-county Gaelic footballers